Du ciment sous les plaines is the third album of the French rock group Noir Désir.

The French edition of Rolling Stone magazine named this album the 21st greatest French rock album (out of 100).

Track listing
 "No no no" - 3:27
 "En route pour la joie" - 3:05
 "Charlie" - 3:57
 "Tu m'donnes le mal" - 3:57
 "Si rien ne bouge" - 5:15
 "The Holy economic war" - 3:03
 "Tout l'or" - 4:13
 "La chanson de la main" - 3:42
 "Pictures of Yourself" -3:13
 "Les oriflammes" - 3:27
 "Elle va où elle veut" - 3:30
 "Le zen émoi" - 3:25
 "The chameleon" - 5:13
 "Hoo Doo" - 0:43

References

Noir Désir albums
1991 albums
Barclays Records albums